Anna Carin Helena Cecilia Zidek (née Olofsson, born 1 April 1973) is a Swedish former biathlete who won a silver medal in the 7.5 km sprint and a gold medal in the 12.5 km mass start event at the 2006 Winter Olympics. Originally a cross-country skier, Olofsson competed at the 2002 Winter Olympics, but in the three events she took part in she made the top 30 only once (15 km freestyle), and the following season she switched to biathlon.

On 3 May 2008 Olofsson married her then boyfriend, Tom Zidek - a serviceman in the Canadian biathlon team - in a ceremony near Canmore, Canada. Olofsson officially announced her retirement on 16 July 2011.

Biathlon World Cup placings 

(Retired 16 July 2011)

Cross-country skiing results
All results are sourced from the International Ski Federation (FIS).

Olympic Games

World Cup

Season standings

References

External links

 Official website 
 IBU Profile

1973 births
Living people
People from Härjedalen Municipality
Cross-country skiers from Jämtland County
Cross-country skiers at the 2002 Winter Olympics
Biathletes at the 2006 Winter Olympics
Biathletes at the 2010 Winter Olympics
Olympic biathletes of Sweden
Olympic cross-country skiers of Sweden
Swedish female cross-country skiers
Olympic gold medalists for Sweden
Olympic silver medalists for Sweden
Olympic medalists in biathlon
Swedish female biathletes
Biathlon World Championships medalists
Medalists at the 2006 Winter Olympics
21st-century Swedish women